Fighter Duel is a first-person combat flight simulator developed by Phillips Interactive and Jaeger Software released in Europe in 1995 for MS-DOS-based IBM PC compatibles.  The game is set during World War II.

Gameplay

The player must shoot down enemy aircraft in duels in the air.

Reception

Computer Game Review gave Fighter Duel a mixed review, and called it "best suited for modem and network play." It was a runner-up for Computer Gaming Worlds 1995 "Simulation of the Year" award, which ultimately went to EF2000. The editors praised Fighter Duels "superb modeling of top World War II fighters and its sweat-inducing head-to-head play."

References

1995 video games
Combat flight simulators
DOS games
DOS-only games
Video games developed in the United States